Dilber dudağı, (lit. lady lips or sweetheart's lips in Turkish), is a Turkish dessert. The ingredients are egg, yogurt, milk, butter, sunflower oil, baking powder, lemon, flour, sugar, water. The dessert reveals sexual imaginations just like other Turkish desserts such as Hanımgöbeği (lady's navel), Vezir Parmağı (visier's fingers), Kerhane Tatlısı (brothel dessert), Sütlü Nuriye (Milky Nuriye) etc.

See also
Şekerpare
Revani
Baklava
Tulumba

References

Turkish desserts